TUHS may refer to:

 Taft Union High School, Taft, California
 Talent Unlimited High School, New York, New York, United States
 Temple University Health System, see Temple University Hospital
 The Unix Heritage Society, a community trying to preserve the historical UNIX operating systems and their heritage
 Tolleson Union High School, Tolleson, Arizona, United States
 Tualatin High School, Tualatin, Oregon, United States
 Tulare Union High School, Tulare, California, United States